Pseudobombax argentinum, the soroche, is a species of flowering plant in the family Malvaceae. It is found in Argentina, Bolivia, Brazil, and Paraguay. It is threatened by habitat loss.

References

argentinum
Data deficient plants
Taxonomy articles created by Polbot